The enzyme  pentalenene synthase (EC 4.2.3.7) catalyzes the chemical reaction

(2E,6E)-farnesyl diphosphate  pentalenene + diphosphate

This enzyme belongs to the family of lyases, specifically those carbon-oxygen lyases acting on phosphates.  The systematic name of this enzyme class is (2E,6E)-farnesyl-diphosphate diphosphate-lyase (cyclizing, pentalenene-forming). This enzyme is also called pentalenene synthetase.

References

 
 
 

EC 4.2.3
Enzymes of unknown structure